Psolodesmus kuroiwae is a species of broad-winged damselflies in the family Calopterygidae.

References

Further reading

External links

 

Calopterygidae